Beijing Ritan High School is a senior high school in the Beijing CBD area of Chaoyang District, Beijing, adjacent to the embassy district and Silk Street.

References

External links
 Beijing Ritan High School 
 Beijing Ritan High School 

Schools in Chaoyang District, Beijing
High schools in Beijing
Educational institutions established in 1963